Abeno (written: 阿倍野 or 阿部野) may refer to:

, ancient name for a landform in Osaka Prefecture, Japan
, ward of Osaka, Japan
, railway station in Osaka, Japan

People with the surname
, Japanese manga artist

Japanese-language surnames